Caradrina selini is a moth of the family Noctuidae. It was described by Jean Baptiste Boisduval in 1840. It is found in most of Europe, North Africa and the Near East.

The wingspan is 25–29 mm for males and 25–30 mm for females. Adults have been recorded on wing from May to August.

The larvae feed on various low-growing plants, including Plantago, Rumex and Taraxacum species.

Subspecies
Caradrina selini selini (south-western Europe, Fennoscandia, Corsica, Sardinia, Italy, the Alps, Germany, the Balkan Peninsula, Crete)
Caradrina selini djebli Rungs, 1972 (Morocco, Algeria, Malta)
Caradrina selini forsteri (Boursin, 1939) (northern Iran)
Caradrina selini mairei Draudt, 1909 (Egypt)
Caradrina selini selinoides Bellier, 1862 (Corsica)

References

External links

"Caradrina selini (Boisduval, 1840)". Insecta.pro.
Lepiforum e.V.

Moths described in 1840
Caradrinini
Moths of Europe
Moths of Asia
Moths of the Middle East
Taxa named by Jean Baptiste Boisduval